Zendaya is the debut studio album by American singer and actress Zendaya, released on September 17, 2013, by Hollywood Records. After acting in the Disney Channel series Shake It Up, Zendaya signed a recording contract with Hollywood Records, in which she began recording her debut in late 2012. Zendaya consists of 12 songs; musically, the album is an electropop album that incorporates renegade urban pop, R&B and dubstep. Lyrically, the album discusses issues of heartbreak and love.

Upon its release, it was met with positive reviews from music critics, who praised the album's production. Commercially, the album debuted on the US Billboard 200 at number 51, selling 7,000 copies in its first week. The album's lead single "Replay" was released on July 16, 2013, and its music video premiered on August 15, 2013, on VEVO and Disney Channel. The single became Zendaya's highest-charting song at the time, charting within both the top forty of the US and New Zealand. To further promote the album, Zendaya performed on a variety of television shows and set out on a North American tour entitled the Swag It Out Tour.

Background
After starting her career as an actress, acting in shows including Shake It Up, she began featuring on soundtracks releasing the singles "Watch Me" and "Something To Dance For", Zendaya announced she has signed a record deal.
On August 8, 2012, Zendaya announced she had signed a record deal with Hollywood Records, via her official Twitter account she commented on the signing writing; "epic moment in my life...it's official!!! HOLLYWOOD RECORDS!!!", the comment also included pictures of herself with the label executives signing a contract. In May 2013, it was reported Coleman's debut album would be released in the fall of 2013 and the album's lead single would be released in June. On August 13, 2013, Zendaya revealed that her debut album would self-titled, along with unveiling the official artwork for the record.

Music and lyrics

Zendaya consists of twelve tracks. The album is mainly rooted in urban electropop, that musically experiment with pop, R&B, trap and dubstep genres. The album's lyrical content tackles issues of love and heartbreak.
After streaming the album to radio presenter Ryan Seacrest, he commented on the album's music calling is a "pop/R&B hybrid offering for the most part", he continued to comment saying the album contained "urban cuts"

The album's opening track and lead single "Replay" is a "grittier club-ready pop track", that was produced by Mick Schultz. "Replay" is an electro-R&B song with influences from glitch and dubstep.
The following song "Fireflies" is blend of pop and R&B genres, that contains a "heavy beat."

"Scared" is an up-tempo pop song that lyrically speaks about "trying to save a relationship because she is scared of being alone". "Scared" was written by Tiffany Fred and Paul "Phamous" Shelton, and was described by Zendaya as having a "Kanye West type of vibe".
"Love You Forever" is an up-tempo "90s throwback" song that has been compared to the work of the late singer Aaliyah. Lyrically the song discusses Zendaya falling in love on the dance floor, the concept of the song is introduced with lyrics such as "We on that all night, get it right/ If you keep on moving like that, I might love you forever/ We on that first time love high/ Just keep on moving/ 'Cause I might love you Forever
."

Promotion
On September 19, 2013, Zendaya made her first national performance on The Ellen DeGeneres Show, in which she sang the album's lead single. On October 29, Zendaya was the New Artist of the Month on The Today Show, where she performed an acoustic version of "Replay". On November 29, she performed "Replay" on BET's 106 & Park. Zendaya further promoted the project by hosting events like "106 & park" special "106 & prom", in which she spoke about her upcoming music project. In early 2012 Zendaya embarked on a North American tour entitled Swag It Out Tour, in order to promote her debut album and the Shake It Up soundtrack. The tour started on August 5, 2012, in Oakland and finished on December 17, 2013. The tour consisted of two legs over America and Canada with a total of twenty one shows.

Singles
"Replay" was released as the album's lead single on July 16, 2013. The song was met with positive reviews from critics noting the single from breaking the musical "mould" and praised the song for its catchy lyrics. Replay was a moderate success in the US, where it debuted at number 77 and reached peak of 40 on the US Billboard Hot 100, making Replay her first Top 40 hit. The song also made appearances on the New Zealand chart and US Billboard Dance Club Play, by peaking at 18 and 3, respectively. It was however a top 10 hit in Australia where it peaked at 8. A remix version of "My Baby", featuring American rappers Ty Dolla Sign, Iamsu! and Bobby Brackins, was released as single. The two versions had a music video.

Critical reception
AllMusic praised the self-titled album, commending its production saying the album "delivers sleek pop thrills with fewer growing pains than some of her predecessors suffered on their early albums". AllMusic continued to compare the album to the debut of Cassie, overall saying the album "is a streamlined, self-assured first effort".

Commercial performance
The album debuted on the US Billboard 200 at number 51, selling 7,000 copies in its first week.

Track listing

Notes
 signifies a vocal producer

Personnel
Credits for Zendaya:

Kazembe Ajamu – management
Brian "Big Bass" Gardner – mastering
Zendaya – executive producer

Charts

Release history

References

External links
 

2013 debut albums
Zendaya albums
Hollywood Records albums
Albums produced by Harmony Samuels
Albums produced by Jason Evigan